Ticknall is a civil parish in the South Derbyshire district of Derbyshire, England.  It contains 66 listed buildings that are recorded in the National Heritage List for England. Of these, two are at Grade II*, the middle of the three grades, and the others are at Grade II, the lowest grade.  The parish contains the village of Ticknall and the surrounding countryside.  Most of the listed buildings are houses, cottages and associated structures, farmhouses and farmbuildings.  In 1914 a series of pillar fountains were installed to provide a supply of fresh water to the village, and 16 of these fountains are listed.  The other listed buildings include a church, the ruins of a previous church, a churchyard cross, two chapels, public houses, a terrace of almshouses, a village lock-up, a tramway arch, two lodges of Calke Abbey, a brick kiln, and a telephone kiosk.


Key

Buildings

References

Citations

Sources

 

Lists of listed buildings in Derbyshire